The Day of the Unification of the Romanian Principalities or, unofficially, the Little Union Day, is a public holiday of Romania celebrated every 24 January to commemorate the unification of the Romanian Principalities (Moldavia and Wallachia), also known as the "Little Union", on 24 January 1859 under prince Alexandru Ioan Cuza. This event is deemed as important as it is considered the first step towards the goal of achieving a unitary Romanian state, something that is considered to have been achieved on 1 December 1918, when the Romanian National Assembly declared the union of Transylvania, Banat, Crișana, and Maramureș with the Kingdom of Romania.

The Day of the Unification of the Romanian Principalities was first adopted by the Senate on 2 June 2014 and later by the Chamber of Deputies on 3 December of the same year. The holiday became official when Romanian President Traian Băsescu signed a few days later a decree promulgating it on 16 December. Thus, Law No. 171/2014 dictates that, on 24 January, central and local authorities can provide material and logistical support to artistic and cultural events dedicated to this day. Since 2016, the observance is a non-working day in Romania.

The Day of the Unification of the Romanian Principalities is also celebrated in Moldova.

See also
Public holidays in Romania
Great Union Day

References

Annual events in Romania
Winter events in Romania
Observances in Romania
January observances
Public holidays in Romania
Romania
2014 establishments in Romania